Ildefonso Paez Santos Jr. (September 5, 1929 – January 29, 2014), popularly known simply as "IP Santos", was a Filipino architect who was known for being the "Father of Philippine Landscape Architecture."  He was recognized as a National Artist of the Philippines in the field of Architecture in 2006.

He was the son of Filipino poet Ildefonso Santos and Asuncion Paez.

Education
Santos graduated from the University of Santo Tomas in 1954 with a degree in the field of architecture. He then pursued a second degree in Architecture, as well as a Master of Architecture degree at the University of Southern California School of Architecture.

Work
Santos pioneered the profession of landscape architecture in the Philippines. He was bestowed with the title of "national artist" for his outstanding achievement in architecture and allied arts on June 9, 2006.

Among the locations that comprise IP Santos' body of work are the landscaping of:
 Cultural Center of the Philippines Complex
 Makati Commercial Center (now Ayala Center)
 Bantayog ng mga Bayani
 Manila Hotel
 San Miguel Corporation Building
 Philippine Plaza (now Sofitel Philippine Plaza Manila)
 Old Nayong Pilipino
 Paco Park
 Rizal Park
 Loyola Memorial Park – Marikina
 Tagaytay Highlands Golf and Country Club
 The Orchard Golf and Country Club
 Magallanes Church
 Asian Institute of Management
 Burnham Park
 Taikoo Shing, Hong Kong

Death 
Santos died of heart failure on January 29, 2014.

References

20th-century Filipino architects
Landscape architects
National Artists of the Philippines
1929 births
2014 deaths
Artists from Metro Manila
University of Santo Tomas alumni
Ateneo de Manila University alumni
People from Malabon
21st-century Filipino architects